is a compilation mini-album released by Japanese idol group BiS as an exclusive at Village Vanguard. The album contains tracks from various singles, as well as a track from their first album Brand-new idol Society. The artwork was designed by Kyosuke Usuta.

Track listing

Personnel
BiS - Lyrics on Tracks 2, 4, 5 and 6
Pour Lui – vocals
Nozomi Hirano – vocals
Yufu Terashima – vocals (except Track 6)
Rio Michibayashi – vocals (Tracks 1 and 4)
Yurika Wakisaka – vocals (Tracks 1 and 4)
Ex BiS
Yukiko Nakayama – vocals (Tracks 2, 3, 5 and 6)
Rina Yokoyama – vocals (Track 6)
Kenta Matsukuma – Sound producer;Programming
Masahiro Inzuka – Guitar
Keita Kitajima – Bass guitar
Tabokun – Bass guitar
Takashi Todoroki – Drums

Notes 
All writing, arrangement and personnel credits taken from the album insert.

References

2012 greatest hits albums
Bis (Japanese idol group) albums